Suite Habana is a 2003 Cuban documentary directed by Fernando Pérez.

The documentary was filmed with fictional cinema techniques depicting a day in a life of thirteen real people, from a ten-year-old child with Down syndrome to a 79-year-old lady who sells peanuts in the street.

The film has no dialogue, using sound and image to evoke emotional effect. Several stories are juxtaposed to convey the plot points, an unusual approach in Cuban cinema, where spoken words are often used extensively.

Critical reception
After the film's premiere in Cuba, national critics ranked it as one of the best Cuban films in decades. The film gathered several awards at international film festivals. Variety called it "A lyrical, meticulously crafted and unexpectedly melancholy homage to the battered but resilient inhabitants of a battered but resilient city."

Awards

HAVANA FILM FESTIVAL - 2003
Best Director
Best Music
Best Sound
Best Film Poster
FIPRESCI prize
Grand Coral - First Prize

UPEC Cultural Circle Award

Goya Awards (Spanish Academy Awards) - 2004
Candidate to the Best Spanish Language Foreign Film (Mejor Película Extranjera de Habla Hispana)

Gramado Film Festival - 2004
Kikito Critics Prize
Special Jury Award

Donostia-San Sebastián International Film Festival - 2003
SIGNIS Award

Cuban Press Association Award
El Mégano Award
for its courageous vision of Havana's daily life and its artistic and powerful use of images and sounds

Glauber Rocha Award

Martin Luther King Memorial Center Award

See also 
 List of Cuban films

External links
 

2003 films
2000s Spanish-language films
Cuban documentary films